Human is the fourth studio album by American rapper Joell Ortiz. The album is entirely produced by Illmind. The album was released on July 17, 2015, by Roseville Music Group and Yaowa! Nation.

Track listing
Credits adapted from the album's official liner notes.

Charts

References

2015 albums
Joell Ortiz albums
Albums produced by Illmind
Albums produced by Cubeatz